Christ and St. Luke's Church is a historic Episcopal church located at Norfolk, Virginia. It was built in 1909–1910, and is a long, narrow building of rough-faced random ashlar in the English Perpendicular Gothic Revival style. It features a tall, four-stage corner tower crowned with battlements and pinnacles.

It was listed on the National Register of Historic Places in 1979. It is located in the North Ghent Historic District.

References

External links
Christ and St. Luke's Church website

20th-century Episcopal church buildings
Episcopal churches in Virginia
Churches on the National Register of Historic Places in Virginia
Gothic Revival church buildings in Virginia
Churches completed in 1910
Churches in Norfolk, Virginia
National Register of Historic Places in Norfolk, Virginia
Historic district contributing properties in Virginia